The Big Annemessex River is a  tributary of the Chesapeake Bay on the Delmarva Peninsula. Tributaries include Annemessex Creek, Holland Creek, Hall Creek, Muddy Creek, Colbourn Creek, Jones Creek and Daugherty Creek.

The river is spanned once by River Road, a residential county road far from any population center.  The Annemessex Creek upstream, however, is spanned by Maryland Route 413.

There is also a Little Annemessex River; the city of Crisfield rests upon its shores.

See also
 List of rivers of Maryland

References

Tributaries of the Chesapeake Bay
Rivers of Maryland
Rivers of Somerset County, Maryland